The 1967 Boston College Eagles football team represented Boston College as an independent during the 1967 NCAA University Division football season. Led by Jim Miller in his sixth and final season as head coach, the Eagles compiled a record of 4–6 for the second consecutive year. Boston College played home games at Alumni Stadium in Chestnut Hill, Massachusetts. Miller resigned at the end of the season, finishing with an overall record of 34–24 in six seasons at Boston College.

Schedule

References

Boston College
Boston College Eagles football seasons
Boston College Eagles football
1960s in Boston